Edward Norman Lewis (September 18, 1858 – February 23, 1931) was a Canadian politician.

Born in Goderich, Canada West, the son of Ira Lewis (who was also a Crown attorney ) and Julia L. Welsh, he was a lawyer, acting crown attorney and Clerk of the Peace for Huron County. He was Mayor of Goderich before being elected to the House of Commons of Canada for the riding of Huron West in the 1904 federal election. A Conservative, he was re-elected in 1908 and 1911. He did not run in 1917.

References

 The Canadian Parliament; biographical sketches and photo-engravures of the senators and members of the House of Commons of Canada. Being the tenth Parliament, elected November 3, 1904

External links
 

1858 births
1931 deaths
Conservative Party of Canada (1867–1942) MPs
Members of the House of Commons of Canada from Ontario
People from Huron County, Ontario